This is a list of events in Scottish television from 1981.

Events

January to June
No events.

July
29 July – The wedding of Prince Charles and Lady Diana Spencer takes place at St Paul's Cathedral. More than 30,000,000 viewers watch the wedding on television – the second highest television audience of all time in Britain.

August
No events.

September
1 September - 20th anniversary of Border Television.
8 September - BBC One Scotland changes its name to BBC Scotland.
30 September - 20th anniversary of Grampian Television.

October
October - Scottish Television becomes the first ITV station to operate a regional Oracle teletext service, containing over 60 pages of local news, sport and information.
17 October - The first edition of a new Sunday lunchtime current affairs series Agenda is broadcast on BBC1 Scotland.

November
No events.

December
No events.

Unknown
Scottish Television airs The Shepherds of Berneray, a 50-minute television documentary revolving around the people on the island of Berneray, North Uist, and how they lived at that time.
Alistair Moffat is appointed Head of Arts at Scottish Television.

Debuts

ITV
5 January - Now You See It (1981–1986)

Television series
Scotsport (1957–2008)
Reporting Scotland (1968–1983; 1984–present)
Top Club (1971–1998)
Scotland Today (1972–2009)
Sportscene (1975–Present)
The Beechgrove Garden (1978–Present)
Grampian Today (1980–2009)
Take the High Road (1980–2003)

Births
10 March - Nicci Jolly, television presenter
Unknown
 Shabana Akhtar, actress
 Cat Cubie, weather presenter
 Shauna Macdonald, actress
 Catriona Shearer, news presenter

Deaths
6 January - A. J. Cronin, 84, writer (Doctor Finlay's Casebook)

See also
1981 in Scotland

References

 
Television in Scotland by year
1980s in Scottish television